SS (RMS) Queen of the Isle was a paddle steamer which was constructed by Robert Napier & Co. Glasgow. No Official number is recorded for the vessel, as formal registration was not introduced until the Merchant Shipping Act 1854.

Launched on Saturday, 3 May 1834, Queen of the Isle entered service with the Isle of Man Steam Packet Company in September of that year.  
Queen of the Isle served the Steam Packet for eleven years, until the Company sold her in 1845.

Construction and dimensions
Queen of the Isle was the third vessel to enter service with the line, and the second to be constructed by Robert Napier & Co.

Length 128'; beam 21'6"; depth 12'7". Schooner rigged with a standing bowsprit, her engine developed a nominal horse-power of 140 h.p.; and gave her a design speed of approximately 9 knots.

The Queen of the Isle was said to be the fastest vessel on the Irish Sea in her day.

The launch of the Queen of the Isle attracted considerable attention from the Scottish press. A report in the Glasgow Herald in 1834 stated:- 

Her commencement of service was greeted with excitement on the Isle of Man, the Mona's Herald stating:-

Service life

Queen of the Isle arrived in Douglas on Wednesday, 10 September 1834.
Captain Gill assumed command, his command of the Mona's Isle being taken by Captain Edward Quayle and on 11 September she took a party of excursionists on a trip around the Island.

1834 also saw the beginning of the daily summer service between Douglas and Liverpool leaving Douglas at 08:00hrs, and Liverpool at 10:00hrs. The winter service was increased to two sailings a week in each direction throughout the winter.

On 25 March 1835, under the command of Capt. Quayle, the Queen of the Isle collided with the steamer Irishman in the Mersey approaches and, although damaged, towed the Irishman into Liverpool.

On 27 May 1835, in a race between the two vessels, Queen of the Isle beat the packet ship Richmond.

In 1842 a Queen of the Isle inaugurated a weekly service between Douglas and Dublin.

Disposal
Before her disposal, Queen of the Isles engine was taken out and installed in the Ben-my-Chree.
Queen of the Isle was then sold and converted to a full rig sailing ship in 1845.

She is reputed to have sailed all over the world, until she was eventually reported lost off the Falkland Islands.

References

Bibliography

 Chappell, Connery (1980). Island Lifeline T.Stephenson & Sons Ltd

External links
 

Ships of the Isle of Man Steam Packet Company
1834 ships
Ferries of the Isle of Man
Steamships
Steamships of the United Kingdom
Merchant ships of the United Kingdom
Paddle steamers of the United Kingdom
Ships built on the River Clyde
Maritime incidents in March 1835
Maritime incidents in 1855
Shipwrecks in the Atlantic Ocean